Mustelinae is a subfamily of family Mustelidae, which includes weasels, ferrets, and minks.



It was formerly defined in a paraphyletic manner to also include wolverines, martens, and many other mustelids, to the exclusion of the otters (Lutrinae).

Extant species of Mustelinae 
Subfamily Mustelinae

The sea mink (Neogale macrodon) is a recently extinct species from the 19th century that was native to the Maritime Provinces of Canada and New England in the United States.

Importance for humans 
Some of the fashion furs come from this subfamily: ermine, weasel, mink and polecat.

Ferret model of COVID-19 

COVID-19 can infect both the European mink (Mustela lutreola) and the American mink (Neogale vison). Ferrets are used to study COVID-19. Ferrets get some of the same symptoms as humans, but they get less sick than farmed mink. Ferrets are a fairly uncommon animal to use as a model, but mice were not an easy model of COVID-19 because mice lack the ACE2 gene.

References

External links 

  Mustelinae